Hardik Sethi (born 26 February 1993) is an Indian cricketer. He made his Twenty20 debut for Services in the 2016–17 Inter State Twenty-20 Tournament on 29 January 2017. He made his List A debut for Services in the 2017–18 Vijay Hazare Trophy on 5 February 2018.

References

External links
 

1993 births
Living people
Indian cricketers
Services cricketers
People from Bikaner